Bernard White Racing was a motor racing team from the United Kingdom. The team was founded by Bernard White and raced in Formula One between 1966 and 1968 using a BRM P261.

In 1966 the team entered cars at the 1966 Monaco Grand Prix with Bob Bondourant driving who came in fourth place, then team's best performance. United States Grand Prix and the Mexican Grand Prix with the Scottish driver Innes Ireland, retiring from both races. They also entered the 1966 International Gold Cup, a non-Championship race in which Innes Ireland finished fourth.

In 1967, the team entered two races with David Hobbs. At the British Grand Prix Hobbs finished eighth, and at the Canadian Grand Prix he finished in ninth place. They also entered Hobbs for the 1967 Syracuse Grand Prix but withdrew their car before the race weekend began.

In 1968 Bernard White entered all three non-championship races with Hobbs. At the Race of Champions Hobbs finished ninth. He finished sixth in both the BRDC International Trophy and the International Gold Cup. The team's last Formula One race was the 1968 Italian Grand Prix for which Frank Gardner failed to qualify.

In 1965 Bernard White entered his ex Maranello Concessionaires Ferrari 250LM (5907) at Mallory Park and Angola (Vic Wilson) and in 1966 at the Daytone Continental driven by Vic Wilson and Denny Hulme and at Brands Hatch and Zeltweg (David Hobbs) and then at Kyalami driven by Mike Hailwood and Bob Anderson.
In addition Bernard White entered his ex-Essex Wire Ford GT40 (P/1001)during 1966 at Croft, Brands Hatch, Zeltweg, Kyalami, Cape Town, Rhodesia, Lourenco Marques, Pietermaritzburg, variously driven by Alan Rees, Innes Ireland, David Hobbs, Mike Spence and Mike Hailwood.

Complete Formula One World Championship results
(key)

Non-championship F1 results

Formula One entrants
British auto racing teams
Auto racing teams established in 1966
Auto racing teams disestablished in 1968